Wörter und Sachen (German for words and things) was a philological movement of the early 20th century that was based largely in Germany and Austria.

Its proponents believed that the etymology of words should be studied in close association or in parallel with the study of the artefacts and cultural concepts which the words had denoted. The process would, it was argued, enable researchers to study linguistic data more effectively.

Many of the principles and the theories of the Wörter und Sachen movement have since been incorporated into modern historical linguistics such as the practice of cross-referencing with archaeological data.

See also
Pragmatic mapping

Historical linguistics
20th century in Germany
Cultural history of Austria
Cultural history of Germany